The Alafia River Reserve is a recreation area and water conservation area managed by the Southwest Florida Water Management District in Mulberry, Florida, Polk County, Florida. It was created to preserve wetlands and includes hiking trails and a picnic area.

References

Rivers of Florida
Southwest Florida Water Management District reserves
Protected areas of Polk County, Florida
Landforms of Polk County, Florida
Mulberry, Florida